Suppressor of cytokine signaling 4 is a protein that in humans is encoded by the SOCS4 gene.

Function

The protein encoded by this gene contains a SH2 domain and a SOCS BOX domain. The protein thus belongs to the suppressor of cytokine signaling (SOCS), also known as STAT-induced STAT inhibitor (SSI), protein family. SOCS family members are known to be cytokine-inducible negative regulators of cytokine signaling. Two alternatively spliced transcript variants encoding the same protein have been found for this gene.

References

Further reading

External links 
PDBe-KB provides an overview of all the structure information available in the PDB for Human Suppressor of cytokine signaling 4 (SOCS4)

Human proteins